Manohar Manoj is an Indian politician, pundit and expert analyst on Indian television. He founded Bharat Parivartan Abhiyan, a campaign against corruption in 2007 from Ghandhi Ashram, Bhitiharwa, West Champaran in the Indian state of Bihar, his home district.

Career

Politician 
As a national convenor of Bharat Parivartan Abhiyan, he made padyatra in 700 villages of West Champaran from June to December 2008. He framed a local manifesto for the Balmikinagar lok sabha constituency. It incorporated a broad range of political and election reform, social awakening and economic planning proposals. The manifesto was entitled 'Champaran Banega Bharat Ka Champion'. It offered a vision to fully utilize the local natural and human resources and provide better local governance.

He fought 2009 and 2014 Lok Sabha elections as an independent candidate from Balmikinagar (Bihar).

Author 

The central point of his work and thinking is the issue of corruption. From his childhood he felt that corruption was the root cause of India's problems. He wrote thousands of articles and reports on this issue. He edited more than 200 issues of Economy India magazine. He writes a very popular political economy column named Rajartha for Economy India and other publications. He founded Bharatiya Yuva Patrakar Sangathan India's first youth media organization in 1995, which basically works for granting constitutional status of fourth estate to media.
He has recently authored a mammoth book on corruption titled 'A Crusade against Corruption on the Neutral Path, which is in two volumes and having 850 pages. He has also authored another book titled 'A Dialogue on System Change, An initiative to make a New India', which has its Hindi edition named 'Vyastha Parivartan ek Vimarsh, pehal ek naye bharat ke rachna ki'. These both books are the complete documentary perspective of our whole public order and governance.

References

External links
 
https://www.business-standard.com/article/news-ians/rajya-sabha-vice-chairman-launches-a-crusade-against-corruption-book-119010500577_1.html
https://searchtopnewsupdates.blogspot.com/2019/01/harivansh-honble-vice-chairman-rajya.html

1966 births
Living people
People from Bettiah